Lester Paul Straker Bolnalda (born October 10, 1959) is a former professional baseball right-handed starting pitcher. He played two seasons for the Minnesota Twins in 1987-88. Straker is currently the pitching coach for the DSL Phillies.

Career
A ten-year minor leaguer, Straker went all the way to the 1987 World Series in his rookie year. As a young prospect, Straker was released by the Cincinnati Reds and Oakland Athletics. He made his major league debut with the Twins as their number-three starter behind Frank Viola and Bert Blyleven.

Straker became the first Venezuelan to pitch in the World Series when he started games three and six. He began 1988 on the disabled list and never completely recovered his form, being released when the season was over. He played two additional seasons in the minor leagues.

In his two-season, 47-game career, Straker had a record of 10–15, with 99 strikeouts, one shutout, one save, and a 4.22 earned run average.

Coaching
Straker was named as the pitching coach for the DSL Phillies for the 2018 season.

See also
 List of players from Venezuela in Major League Baseball

External links

Pura Pelota

1959 births
Living people
Albany-Colonie A's players
Billings Mustangs players
Cedar Rapids Reds players
Eugene Emeralds players
Greensboro Hornets players
Indianapolis Indians players
Major League Baseball pitchers
Major League Baseball players from Venezuela
Mexican League baseball pitchers
Minnesota Twins players
Minor league baseball coaches
Navegantes del Magallanes players
Orlando Twins players
People from Ciudad Bolívar
Portland Beavers players
Rieleros de Aguascalientes players
Saraperos de Saltillo players
Sultanes de Monterrey players
Tampa Tarpons (1957–1987) players
Tigres de Aragua players
Toledo Mud Hens players
Venezuelan baseball coaches
Venezuelan expatriate baseball players in Mexico
Venezuelan expatriate baseball players in the United States
Waterbury Reds players
Jungo Bears players
Venezuelan expatriate baseball players in Taiwan
Venezuelan expatriate baseball players in Italy